Hantai District, is a district and the seat of the city of Hanzhong, Shaanxi province, China.

Administrative divisions
As 2019, Hantai District is divided to 8 subdistricts and 7 towns.
Subdistricts

Towns

References

Districts of Shaanxi
Hanzhong